Alexandra the Maccabee (died ca. 28 BC) was the daughter of Hyrcanus II (died 30 BC), who was the son of Alexander Jannaeus. She married her cousin Alexander of Judaea (died 48 BC), who was the son of Aristobulus II. Their grandfather was Alexander Jannaeus, the second eldest son of John Hyrcanus. Their daughter was the Hasmonean Mariamne and son was Aristobulus III.

Alexandra opposed her son-in-law Herod, and when he became sick with grief after having Mariamne executed, Alexandra tried to seize power, but was unsuccessful and was herself executed.

References

Footnotes

External link
 
 
Egyptian family trees including Alexandra Maccabeus 

63 BC births
28 BC deaths
Jews and Judaism in the Roman Republic
Executed royalty
Maccabees
1st-century BC women
1st-century BCE Jews
Ancient Jewish women